Gedaya Abrahams is a South African cricketer, who played two First-class matches in the Howa Bowl for Eastern Province in the summer of 1981–82.

Abrahams received his shot at First-class cricket when six members of the Eastern Province team refused to play matches against Natal and Transvaal over the festive season.

References 

South African cricketers
Year of birth missing (living people)
Living people
Place of birth missing (living people)